Rhox homeobox family member 1 is a protein that in humans is encoded by the RHOXF1 gene.

References

Further reading